Canada competed at the 1996 Summer Paralympics in Atlanta, United States, from August 16 to 25, 1996. 133 athletes (95 men and 38 women) competed in 15 sports. Canada won a total of 69 medals and finished in seventh on the medal table.

Wheelchair basketball player Marni Abbott was the country's flag bearer at the opening ceremony. She earned a gold medal in women's wheelchair basketball.

Medallists

Paralympic sports

Demonstration sports
Canada won a silver medal in both team sailing and wheelchair rugby. These two sports were later recognised as Paralympic sports in the 2000 Summer Paralympics.

See also
Canada at the Paralympics
Canada at the 1996 Summer Olympics

References 

Nations at the 1996 Summer Paralympics
1996
Summer Paralympics